White Nights 3.98 is a 1998 South Korean television series based on the novel of the same title by Han Tae-hoon. It aired on SBS from August 31, 1998 to November 3, 1998.

Cast

Main characters
Choi Min-soo as Kwon Taek-hyeong, major in the Korean People's Army
Kim Jung-woo as young Taek-hyeong
Kim Min-sung as teenage Taek-hyeong
Shim Eun-ha as Anastasia Jang
Kwon Hae-kwang as young Anastasia
Lee Eun-ju as teenage Anastasia
Lee Byung-hun as Min Gyeong-bin, Korean Central Intelligence agent and former Air Force first lieutenant
Shin Joo-ho as young Gyeong-bin
Lee Jong-soo as teenage Gyeong-bin
Lee Jung-jae as Lee Young-jun
Jin Hee-kyung as Oh Seong-shim
Wang Hee-ji as Hong Jung-yeon
Song Hye-kyo as teenage Jung-yeon
Yoo Jun-sang as Kim Jin-seok, ANSP intelligence agent
Kim Jung-ho as teenage Jin-seok

Supporting characters
Jung Hyung-ki as General Kwon Ki-wook, Taek-hyeong's father and member of Unit 124
Kim Eun-sook as Ki-wook's wife
Lee Seok as General Kwon Dong-wook, Ki-wook's brother
Park Woong as Anatoly Jang, father of Anastasia, Soviet nuclear physicist, and deputy director of the Irkutsk Atomic Energy Institute 
Jo Kyung-hwan as Yuri Kim, Chechen mafia boss
Shin Hyun-joon as Peter Kim, son of Yuri
Im Hyeok-ju as Min Se-yoon, father of Gyeong-bin and captain of the Jongno Police Station
Park Soon-cheon as Se-yoon's wife
Kim Young-ae as Hong Young-sook, Agency for National Security Planning and Consul General to Russia, aunt of Jung-yeon
Park Sang-won as Air Force major Choi Sang-gyu
Kim Ye-ryeong as Sang-gyu's wife
Park Eun-bin as Choi So-young, Sang-gyu's daughter
Nam Sung-hoon as ANSP personnel
Jo Hyung-ki as Park Seon-bae, ANSP agent sent to Russia
Lee Seung-hyung as ANSP agent sent to Russia
Lee Hee-do as ANSP agent sent to Kazakhstan
Choi Jong-hwan as Major Lee Young-hu, Young-jun's older brother and commanding officer of Jang Baek-ho troop
Nam Na-kyung as Yoon Sook-kyung, Young-hu's wife
Kwak Jung-wook as Lee Min-ki, Young-hu's son
Son Ho-gyun as Yasuda, Pyongyang gangster boss
Yoon Yong-hyun as Yasuda's underling
Kim Ki-beom as "Crocodile," Yasuda's underling
Jung Ui-gap as "Crayfish," Yasuda's underling
Kim Byung-ki as Oh Geuk-chul, father of Seong-shim and lieutenant general of the Korean People's Army
Song Kwi-hyun as Geuk-chul's deputy
Shim Yang-hong as Chairman of Wildcat crash investigation committee 
Jung Dong-hwan as Colonel Woo
Lee Ki-young as Choi Deuk-gu, Jang Baek-ho troop
Kim Se-jun as Oh Dae-gyu, army doctor of Jang Baek-ho troop
Jung Woong-in as Baek Seung-je, signaller of Jang Baek-ho troop
Jung Sung-mo as Kim Il-gu, former Air Force first lieutenant

References

External links
 (archived)
White Nights 3.98 at SBS Collection
White Nights 3.98 review at SPCNET

Korean-language television shows
1998 South Korean television series debuts
1998 South Korean television series endings
Seoul Broadcasting System television dramas
Television shows written by Kang Eun-kyung
South Korean action television series
Television shows based on South Korean novels